Townsville is a city on the north-eastern coast of Queensland, Australia, with four commercial radio stations, four narrowcast radio stations, three community radio stations, five Australian Broadcasting Corporation (ABC) radio stations, three commercial television stations, a regional daily newspaper and a community weekly newspaper. There are no local Sunday papers although the Sunday Mail (based in Brisbane) publishes a North Queensland edition, which is printed and distributed from Townsville (throughout Northern Queensland). Townsville also has extensive outdoor and indoor advertising media, ranging from taxi advertising to large-format billboards.

Print media

The Townsville Bulletin is the only newspaper in Townsville, with daily coverage on local, state, national and world news, with sections and liftouts on health, real estate, youth, beauty, cars and lifestyle.  The Bulletin is in tabloid format.  In 2006 the Bulletin had a readership (average) Monday to Friday of 84,000 (up 15.5% on 2005) and weekend readership (average) of 104,000 (up 1.96% on 2005) and circulation (avg) of 27 187 Monday to Friday, weekend circulation (avg) of 41 814.  The Townsville Bulletin is owned by News Limited, a subsidiary of News Corporation, and employs over 100 people.

HUXLEY Press is a regional online music, arts and creative culture street press. 5,000 copies (with a readership of approximately 15,000) are distributed via galleries, theatres, performing arts groups, retail outlets, hotels, secondary and tertiary education campuses in Townsville, Hinchinbrook, Charters Towers and the Shire of Burdekin.

Magnetic Island has two competing small publications; Magnetic Island Community News is printed weekly and Magnetic Times is published online.

The North Queensland Register is based in Townsville. However, it services the Queensland rural community from Rockhampton North. Owned by Rural Press Limited, it has a distribution of about 5,000.

Northern Services Courier is an independent newspaper for Australian Defence Force personnel stationed in Townsville.

The Hack (formerly known as The Bullsheet) is the student community newspaper at James Cook University,  published by the JCU Student Association. Outlook is the academic community newspaper at the university and it is published by the University.

Radio

Television

All three main commercial networks produce local news coverage - Seven Queensland and WIN Television both air 30-minute local news bulletins at 6pm each weeknight, produced from newsrooms in the city but broadcast from studios in Maroochydore and Wollongong respectively. Southern Cross 10 airs a short regional Queensland news updates.

National and international news bulletins are shown on each respective network in place of or following local news - four are produced in Brisbane, with a Queensland focus (ABC, Seven, Nine and Ten). The Brisbane edition of 10 News First also employs a North Queensland reporter based in Townsville, covering roughly from the tip of Cape York South to Mackay.

New channels broadcast by all the networks in addition to the ones listed above are available on Freeview Australia to viewers in Townsville and the surrounding region. These channels include ABC TV Plus, ABC Me, ABC News, SBS Viceland, 10 Bold, 10 Peach, 7two, 7mate, 9Gem and 9Go!.

Pay TV

Internet

Currently the only major local producer of online journalism is ABC North Queensland.

References

Townsville
Townsville
Townsville